The Xiguayuan Formation is an Early Cretaceous (Barremian) geologic formation in Hebei Province of China. Fossil ornithopod tracks have been reported from the formation. It was deposited in a shallow lacustrine setting and is noted for its hyperpycnite facies.

Fossil content 
The formation has provided the following fossils:
Ichnofossils
 Iguanodontia indet.
 Theropoda indet.
Insects
 Gurvanomyia rohdendorfi
 Huaxiaplecia zhongguanensis
 Longhuaia orientalis
Bivalves
 Weichangella caelata

See also 
 List of dinosaur-bearing rock formations
 List of stratigraphic units with ornithischian tracks
 Ornithopod tracks

References

Bibliography 

   
 
  

Geologic formations of China
Lower Cretaceous Series of Asia
Cretaceous China
Barremian Stage
Conglomerate formations
Mudstone formations
Sandstone formations
Siltstone formations
Tuff formations
Fluvial deposits
Lacustrine deposits
Ichnofossiliferous formations
Paleontology in Hebei